Gustava Johanna Stenborg, as married later Hahr and Yckerberg, (1776–1819), was a Swedish artist.

She was born to secretary Johan Fredrik Stenborg and Henrica Hellman. Stenborg was a textile artist (embroidery). She was a student in the Royal Swedish Academy of Arts when she participated in their 1790 art exhibition with a work in white sateen, for which she was awarded the memory prize of the royal academy. She was married to estate owner Henric Wilhelm Hahr, Jr. in 1793, and to estate-clerk Per Otto Yckerberg in 1815.

References 
 Svenskt konstnärslexikon (Swedish Art dictionary). Red. Johnny Roosval & Gösta Lilja. Malmö: Allhems Förlag 1952.

18th-century Swedish people
1776 births
1819 deaths
Swedish textile artists
Swedish women artists
Gustavian era people
18th-century Swedish artists
19th-century Swedish artists
18th-century women textile artists
18th-century textile artists
19th-century women textile artists
19th-century textile artists
Swedish embroiderers